Depetris is a surname. Notable people with the surname include:

David Depetris (born 1988), Argentine-born Slovak footballer
Leandro Depetris (born 1988), Argentine footballer
Marie-Chantal Depetris-Demaille (born 1941), French fencer
Rodrigo Depetris (born 1990), Argentine footballer